Steampunk is a subgenre of fantasy and speculative fiction that came into prominence in the 1980s and early 1990s. The term denotes works set in an era or world wherein steam power is still widely used—usually the 19th century, and often set in Victorian era England—but with prominent elements of either science fiction or fantasy, such as fictional technological inventions like those found in the works of H. G. Wells and Jules Verne, or real technological developments like the computer occurring at an earlier date. Other examples of steampunk contain alternate history-style presentations of "the path not taken" of such technology as dirigibles or analog computers; these frequently are presented in an idealized light, or with a presumption of functionality.

Although many works now considered seminal to the genre were published in the 1960s and 1970s, the term "steampunk" originated in the late 1980s, as a tongue-in-cheek variant of cyberpunk.

This article is a list of works in the science fiction and fantasy genres considered by commentators to be steampunk.

Precursors 

Although the term "steampunk" was not coined until 1987, several works of fiction significant to the development of the genre were produced before that. For example, Mervyn Peake's novel Titus Alone (1959) anticipated many of the tropes of steampunk. Steampunk elements have also consistently appeared in mainstream manga since the 1940s, dating back to Osamu Tezuka's epic science-fiction trilogy consisting of Lost World (1948), Metropolis (1949) and Nextworld (1951).

Steampunk was particularly influenced by, and often adopts the style of the scientific romances and fantasies of the 19th century. Notably influential authors are:

 G. K. Chesterton
 Charles Dickens
 Arthur Conan Doyle
 George Griffith
 H. P. Lovecraft
 Albert Robida
 Mary Shelley
 Robert Louis Stevenson
 Bram Stoker
 Mark Twain
 Jules Verne
 H. G. Wells

Early adaptations of this scientific romance literature genre to film, particularly those from the 1950s and 1960s, are notable precursors of steampunk cinema:
 20,000 Leagues Under the Sea (1954)
 From the Earth to the Moon (1958)
 Journey to the Center of the Earth (1959)
 The Time Machine (1960)
 Master of the World (1961)
 First Men in the Moon (1964)
 Captain Nemo and the Underwater City (1969)

Comics and graphic novels

Film and television

Films

Television

Games

Role-playing games 

 Airship Pirates (2011)
 Castle Falkenstein (1994) by Mike Pondsmith
 Forgotten Futures (1993) by Marcus L. Rowland
 GURPS Steampunk (2000)
 Iron Kingdoms (2004)
 Kerberos Club for Wild Talents (2009), Savage Worlds (2010), and Fate (2011)
 Space: 1889 (1988)
 Tephra: The Steampunk RPG (2012)

Video games

Literature

Music

Steampunk musicians 
The following is a list of musicians and bands that have either adopted a steampunk aesthetic in their appearance, or have a decidedly steampunk approach to their music.

Other bands with steampunk-themed works 

While not strictly steampunk in their general appearance or approach to music, several musicians and bands have produced music, music videos or concept albums that directly appeal to the steampunk aesthetic. Included in these are:

Performance art 
 Airship Isabella
 League of S.T.E.A.M. (Supernatural and Troublesome Ectoplasmic Apparition Management), a.k.a. the "Steampunk Ghostbusters", a performance art troupe from Southern California popular in the steampunk community and specializing in live interactive themed entertainment
 Penny Dreadful Productions
 The Cirque du Soleil touring show Kurios

See also 
 Cyberpunk
 Dieselpunk
 List of cyberpunk works
 Retro-futurism
 Science fiction Western

Notes

External links 
 Steampunk bibliography and list of exhibits and blogs, UC Davis Library
 Steampunkopedia, a compendium of all things steampunk, including a chronology
 Steampunk Books List and Reviews, a blog devoted steampunk books.